Marecia Pemberton (born 7 January 1990) is a retired Kittian sprinter.

She competed collegiately for the Florida State Seminoles from 2010 to 2014. Individually she reached the semi-final at the 2014 Commonwealth Games and competed at the 2015 Pan American Games, both in the 100 metres. She also finished sixth in the 4 × 100 metres relay at the 2008 World Junior Championships.

Her personal best times were 11.29 seconds in the 100 metres, achieved in May 2010 in Greensboro; and 23.67 seconds in the 200 metres, achieved in April 2011 in Tallahassee.

References

1990 births
Living people
Saint Kitts and Nevis female sprinters
Athletes (track and field) at the 2014 Commonwealth Games
Commonwealth Games competitors for Saint Kitts and Nevis
Athletes (track and field) at the 2015 Pan American Games
Pan American Games competitors for Saint Kitts and Nevis
Saint Kitts and Nevis expatriate sportspeople in the United States
Florida State Seminoles women's track and field athletes